Sylvie Joly (18 October 1934 – 4 September 2015) was a French actress and comedian. She was best known for her roles in the films Going Places (1974) and Get Out Your Handkerchiefs (1978).

Personal life
Joly was born in Paris. She had a daughter, Mathilde Vitry, and a son Gregoire Vitry. In October 2010, she revealed she had Parkinson's disease.

Joly died from a heart attack on 4 September 2015 in Paris, aged 80.

Filmography

Theater

References

External links
 

1934 births
2015 deaths
Actresses from Paris
French film actresses
20th-century French actresses
21st-century French actresses
French women comedians
20th-century French comedians
21st-century French comedians
French stage actresses
French television actresses
Burials at Père Lachaise Cemetery